Marco Taradash (born 19 May 1950, in Livorno) is an Italian politician and journalist.

Biography
Marco Taradash was born in Livorno on 19 May 1950 from a Tuscan mother and a New Yorker father, who came to Italy with the allied army. The surname has a Ukrainian Jewish origin, but while the grandmother, Zweig, kept the Jewish faith, the paternal grandfather, who fled as a child with the family to the United States, later converted to Catholicism, and the father to Protestantism.

In 1968 he enrolled in the youth organization of the Italian Liberal Party, which he left in the mid-seventies, to join the Radical Party. In the 70s he also began his journalistic career and thanks to "Stampa e Regime", the press review of Radio Radicale, he also obtained one of the most famous Italian journalistic prizes, the Premiolino.

He was elected to the European Parliament in 1989 for the Antiprohibitionists on Drugs list, while in 1994 and in 1996 he was elected to the Chamber of Deputies for Forza Italia. He also served as Chairman of the RAI Supervision Commission from 1994 to 1996.

In the 2000s he conducts some television programs of political depth. In 2005 he founded, along with Peppino Calderisi and Benedetto Della Vedova, the Liberal Reformers movement.

In 2009 he was a candidate for mayor of Livorno with the support of the centre-right coalition but he was defeated by the outgoing mayor Alessandro Cosimi, candidate for the Democratic Party.

In 2010 he was elected to the Regional Council of Tuscany for The People of Freedom, but in 2013 he left it to join the New Centre-Right, a party led by Angelino Alfano.

In the European elections of 2019 he is a candidate for the European Parliament with More Europe, in the central Italian constituency.

References

1955 births
Living people
People from Livorno
Italian journalists
20th-century Italian politicians
21st-century Italian politicians
Radical Party (Italy) politicians
Forza Italia politicians
The People of Freedom politicians
New Centre-Right politicians